True Vibe was a CCM group that was active from 1999 to 2003. Composed of members Jonathan Lippmann, Nathan Gaddis, Jason Barton, and Jordan Roe, the group was born out of Lippmann's desire to pursue musical excellence without watering down his Christian faith.

Biography
Jonathan Lippmann left 98 Degrees just before they signed a recording contract; he had already signed on to several roles as an actor, but also found himself somewhat uncomfortable with his understanding of religion. After performing on Sweet Valley High and doing commercials for Burger King, Lippmann formed True Vibe in Nashville, Tennessee, and signed with Essential Records. The group released two albums on Essential.

The second album (See The Light) was Grammy-nominated for Best Pop/Contemporary Christian Album. Sometime in 2003, the group parted ways. Jonathan Lippmann told a Christian magazine that he thought about replacing the other three guys but decided against it.

They may be best known to mainstream audiences for appearing on the title track to NSYNC members' Lance Bass and Joey Fatone's film, On the Line.

True Vibe performed on the Late Show with David Letterman and are featured on the Jimmy Neutron soundtrack.

Member Jason Barton later became lead singer of the band 33Miles.

Member Nathan Gaddis is now a traveling worship leader, leading in churches, conferences and events.

Previous members included Chad Jarnagin, Terry Fritch, and Scott Pyper, who all left the group just before signing a recording contract.

Discography
True Vibe (Essential Records, released May 2001.)
Charts: US Billboard 200 #178, US Contemporary Christian #10.
The album spent 16 weeks on the charts and spawned a Radio Disney hit with "Jump, Jump, Jump" and a Christian radio hit with the single, "You Are The Way".
See the Light (Essential, released July 2002.)
Charts: US Contemporary Christian #22.
This album was Grammy-nominated for Best Pop/Contemporary Christian Album of the Year.

References

American boy bands
American Christian musical groups
Musical groups from Tennessee
Musical groups established in 1999
1999 establishments in Tennessee